Nelson Lautaro Ledesma (born 25 July 1990) is an Argentinian professional golfer who currently plays on PGA Tour. He has won twice on the Korn Ferry Tour.

Professional career
Ledesma turned professional in 2007 and played much of his early career on the Argentine national professional golf tour, winning the Order of Merit in 2014, the Tour de las Américas and the PGA Tour Latinoamérica. He gained his card on the second tier United States based Web.com Tour for the 2018 season after finishing 5th on the PGA Tour Latinoamérica Order of Merit in 2017.

Ledesma won on his debut season on the Web.com Tour at the LECOM Health Challenge. This was his only top-10 finish of the season and he finished 42nd in the money list. He claimed his second victory on the renamed Korn Ferry Tour the following year at the TPC Colorado Championship, and finished the season in 8th place on the regular season points list to earn his card on the PGA Tour for the 2019–20 season.

Professional wins (9)

Korn Ferry Tour wins (2)

PGA Tour Latinoamérica wins (1)

Tour de las Américas wins (1)

1Co-sanctioned by the TPG Tour

TPG Tour wins (5)

1Co-sanctioned by the Tour de las Américas

Ángel Cabrera Tour wins (1)

Team appearances
Professional
Aruba Cup (representing PGA Tour Latinoamérica): 2017

See also
2019 Korn Ferry Tour Finals graduates

References

External links
 
 Nelson Ledesma at the TPG Tour official site
 

Argentine male golfers
PGA Tour Latinoamérica golfers
PGA Tour golfers
Sportspeople from Tucumán Province
1990 births
Living people